Erythrocebus is a genus of Old World monkey. All three species in this genus are found in Africa, and are known as patas monkeys. While previously considered a monotypic genus containing just E. patas, a 2017 review argued that, based on morphological evidence and heavy geographic separation between taxa, E. patas should be split back into distinct species as recognised in the 19th century.

There are three species recognized:

 Southern patas monkey (Erythrocebus baumstarki)
 Common patas monkey (Erythrocebus patas)
 Blue Nile patas monkey (Erythrocebus poliophaeus)

References 

 
Mammals of Sub-Saharan Africa
Taxa named by Édouard Louis Trouessart
Taxa described in 1897